Pilgrims is a graphic adventure game developed and published by Amanita Design. The game was released for Windows, Linux, and iOS on 6 October 2019. Pilgrims is one of the first games distributed through Apple Arcade.

Development 
The game was developed by a team led by Jakub Dvorský. It was in development for two years. The idea for the game came from a card mini-game found in Samorost 3.

Gameplay
Pilgrims is a point-and-click adventure game. The player controls an adventurer who wants to take a boat ride, but the owner of the boat refuses to take him until he catches a bird for her. He is eventually joined by other characters (a crone, a devil, a robber and a princess). Each of them has a problem that the player has to solve in order to get the elusive bird, but also an ability to help him with his quest.

The world is made up of a collection of scenes which can be traversed using a world map. While looking at a scene, the player can click on objects to pick them up. Objects that have been collected, as well as characters who have joined the player, are represented by a deck of cards under the scene view. Cards can be dragged from the deck onto the scene in order to use them. For several problems the player can apply multiple solutions by choosing another character or another item. So the story can differ somewhat in different playthroughs.

Reception

Pilgrims received positive reviews from critics. Games.cz gave it 8/10, stating that it was a nice walk through the world of Czech fairy tales and humor. Rock, Paper, Shotgun praised the game's concept and replayability value. Adventure Gamers gave Pilgrims an "excellent" rating.

Accolades

References

External links

2019 video games
Point-and-click adventure games
Amanita Design games
Art games
Indie video games
IOS games
Video games developed in the Czech Republic
Windows games
Single-player video games